The Netherlands women's national baseball team is the national women's baseball team of the Netherlands. They are currently the only team representing Europe in international competition.

The team is controlled by the Women's Baseball Netherlands Foundation, an independent organisation founded by Ivette van Putten and Percy Isenia. The Netherlands debuted in the 2010 Women's Baseball World Cup.

Current rosters
The following players make up the provisional squad selected for the Dutch team for the 2014 Women's Baseball World Cup, held in September 2014.

International competition

2010 Women's Baseball World Cup

2012 Women's Baseball World Cup

2014 Women's Baseball World Cup

Shooting incident
On August 13, a Hong Kong player was shot in the leg during a game against the Netherlands at the 2010 Women's Baseball World Cup. The incident occurred in the top of the fourth inning, when the Netherlands were leading with 12–9. The game was being held at the José Antonio Casanova stadium in Fort Tiuna, a military garrison in Caracas.

See also
Netherlands men's national baseball team

External links
Official Website Women's Baseball in the Netherlands

References

Baseball
Women's national baseball teams